Austrolaelaps is a genus of mites in the family Laelapidae.

Species
 Austrolaelaps mitchelli Womersley, 1956

References

Laelapidae